Press Play is a 2022 science fiction romantic drama film written and directed by Greg Björkman in his directorial debut, from a story by Josh Boone. It stars Clara Rugaard, Lewis Pullman, Lyrica Okano, Christina Chang, Matt Walsh, and Danny Glover. It was shot on Oahu. The film was released in the United States on June 24, 2022, by The Avenue. It received mixed reviews from critics.

Plot
Laura's friend Chloe introduces her to her stepbrother, Harrison, who works at the record store Lost & Found. They immediately connect and attend a Japanese Breakfast show together. She meets the record store's owner, Cooper. At the beach, Harrison gifts Laura a cassette so they can create a mixtape. They celebrate after learning an art-related mentorship has accepted Laura. He mentions his intentions of moving to attend medical school but is interrupted by an earthquake. At her house, she shows him her art. Harrison's parents tell Laura that Harrison is going to a medical school on the other side of the country. Harrison privately tells Laura he does not want to go so he can stay with her. She tells him she does not want to be the reason he gives up on his dreams; he reassures her of his decision to stay. They attend her art exhibition. On his birthday, they finish painting a mural. The next day, Harrison is hit and killed by a car. Laura destroys the mural and leaves behind her mixtape at Lost & Found.

Four years later, Laura attends Chloe's wedding. Cooper gives Laura her mixtape back. She goes home to listen to it. After pressing play, Laura is transported to her first date with Harrison at the Japanese Breakfast concert. After a brief moment, she returns to the present. Every time she presses play, the mixtape sends her back in time. She does it again and appears on their date at the beach. She warns him about his future death and convinces him by predicting the earthquake seconds before it happens. In the present, she learns she is affecting the future after learning Chloe has married a different, obnoxious man instead of her soulmate. She learns Harrison had died the same day from falling off a cliff.

Her next click sends her to the time she showed Harrison her art. She warns him to stay away from the cliffs. This time, after returning, she learns Harrison died from electrocution after stepping on a downed power line. She presses play again and now appears at the party hosted at Lost & Found where they talked about their future, but her time is cut short. Her actions altered their timeline to where Lost & Found burned down with Harrison inside and the mixtape is no longer in her possession. She visits a depressed Cooper, gets the mixtape from this timeline, and tells Cooper about its powers. Cooper mentions the possibility that she is not supposed to save him but she tries anyway. Harrison still died, this time in a car accident with his dad. Once again, Laura presses play. She appears at her art exhibition. She tells Harrison to break up with her and go to medical school. In the present, she tries calling him but the call goes straight to voicemail. She immediately presses play again and appears in their last important moment: the day they finished the mural. She confronts him for not breaking up but Harrison says he would rather risk staying with her than leaving and dying anyway.

In the present, Laura forces herself to accept the fact she cannot be with Harrison. While at Chloe's, she discovers an additional song on the B-side of the cassette. The song sends her back in time to the moment they were going to meet for the first time. She decides to save his life by not stepping inside Lost & Found. In the present, a cheerful Chloe invites Laura to Christmas dinner. Chloe is married to her soulmate as the changes to the timeline have been reverted. Harrison arrives and introduces himself to Laura.

Cast
 Clara Rugaard as Laura
 Lewis Pullman as Harrison
 Lyrica Okano as Chloe
 Christina Chang as Mrs. Knott
 Matt Walsh as Mr. Knott
 Danny Glover as Cooper
 Japanese Breakfast as themselves

Soundtrack

 Romes ft. Haiva Ru – All The Time
 Slowdive – Sugar for the Pill
 Japanese Breakfast – Boyish
 Jesse Mailin – Greener Pastures
 Will Joseph Cook – Something to Feel Good About
 Dayglow – Can I Call You Tonight?
 Ashley Jane – How Lucky Am I
 Amy Stroup – Hold What You Can
 Father John Misty – Do You Realize
 Kina Grannis – It's Hard to Be Human
 Kimié ft. Imua Garza – Make Me Say
 Robin Kester – Day Is Done (demo)
 Conor O'Brien – Bright Yellow
 Kapono Beamer – The Manu Oo Hula
 Katyna Ranieri, Riz Ortolani – Oh My Love
 APM Music – O Christmas Tree
 The Thorns – Among the Living

Production
Press Play is a romantic drama directed by Greg Björkman that incorporates music into its story. It is written by Björkman and James Bachelor from a story by Josh Boone. On October 7, 2019, CJ Entertainment announced it would produce the film starring Clara Rugaard, Lewis Pullman, Danny Glover, and Lyrica Okano. In a statement, Boone said "music has always been my magic carpet ride into the past. This story sprung from that idea — music as time travel." Björkman said "music can be such an integral part of one's life. What better way to travel back in time than through the soundtrack of your youth." Filming began that same month in Hawaii. By May 2020, the film was in post-production with music supervisor Season Kent and editor Patrick J. Don Vito. It is Björkman's feature film directorial debut.

Release
In November 2021, The Avenue acquired the distribution rights. The film was released in the United States in theaters and on digital on June 24, 2022.

Reception
On the review aggregator Rotten Tomatoes, 65% of 17 reviews are positive, with an average rating of 5.90/10.

References

External links
 
 

2022 directorial debut films
2022 romantic drama films
American romantic drama films
CJ Entertainment films
Films about time travel
Films produced by Jonathan Schwartz
Films shot in Hawaii
Films set in Hawaii
2020s English-language films
2020s American films